Kathleen Smith or Kathy Critchlow-Smith is a British Paralympic archer who has competed at five Paralympics.

Life

It was the 1992 Summer Paralympics in Barcelona that first made Smith aware of international competition. She was one of the 21 women and 74 men there from 26 countries to compete at seven sports. Great Britain won no medals at archery that year. Smith saw that her competitors had coaches to encourage them. She had already met Ray Fields so on her return in 1994 she joined Sportsable which was a sports disability club in Maidenhead. Smith's motive was to gain Fields as a coach. Fields had become disabled when he was 70 years old.

She concentrated on her archery skills and by 1996 she was considered an elite sportswoman and a contestant at the 1996 Atlanta Paralympics. She joined Anita Chapman and Rebecca Gale to gain a bronze medal for Great Britain in the women’s archery team open. At these Games, Chapman also won a silver medal.

Smith had surgery in 1999 and thought this might rule her out of competition, but at the 2000 Sydney Paralympics she was again in Britain's team of three archers who competed for the women’s archery team open, winning the silver. Smith gained an individual silver in the women’s individual W1/W2 behind Paola Fantato of Italy.

Four years later at the 2004 Athens Paralympics, Smith won her fourth and last medal, winning the gold in the women’s archery team open with Chapman again as a team mate.

She was a competitor at five Paralympics, Barcelona 1992, Atalanta 1996, Sydney 2000, Athens 2004 and Beijing 2008.

Private Life
She is married to Gary Critchlow-Smith who volunteers as an archery tutor. Both she and her husband are long tern supporters of sports for those with disabilities. They took the Hungarian archer Tamas Gaspar under their wing as he aimed to get to the 2020 Summer Paralympics. They were both given lifetime achievement awards at the 8th Get Berkshire Active Awards by SportsAble. They are both qualified coaches and they give weekly coaching sessions.

References

Living people
British female archers
Year of birth missing (living people)
Paralympic archers of Great Britain
Paralympic gold medalists for Great Britain
Paralympic silver medalists for Great Britain
Paralympic bronze medalists for Great Britain
Paralympic medalists in archery
Archers at the 1996 Summer Paralympics
Archers at the 2000 Summer Paralympics
Archers at the 2004 Summer Paralympics
Medalists at the 1996 Summer Paralympics
Medalists at the 2000 Summer Paralympics
Medalists at the 2004 Summer Paralympics
20th-century British women
21st-century British women